Bosnia-Herzegovina competed at the 2004 Summer Paralympics in Athens, Greece. The team included 15 athletes. Competitors from Bosnia-Herzegovina won one gold medal to finish 57th in the medal table.

Medallists

Sports

Athletics

Men's field

Cycling

Swimming

Volleyball
The men's volleyball team won the gold medal after defeating Iran in the gold medal final.

Players
Safet Alibašić 
Fikret Causevic 
Sabahudin Delalic 
Esad Durmisevic 
Ismet Godinjak 
Dževad Hamzić 
Ermin Jusufović 
Zikret Mahmic
Adnan Manko 
Asim Medić 
Ejub Mehmedovic 
Nedzad Salkic

Tournament

See also
Bosnia and Herzegovina at the Paralympics
Bosnia and Herzegovina at the 2004 Summer Olympics

References 

Nations at the 2004 Summer Paralympics
2004 in Bosnia and Herzegovina sport
Bosnia and Herzegovina at the Paralympics